Elvir Koljić (born 8 July 1995) is a Bosnian professional footballer who plays as a forward for Liga I club Universitatea Craiova.

Koljić started his professional career at Triglav, before joining Krupa in 2014. A year later, he moved to Borac Banja Luka. The following year, he went back to Krupa, who loaned him to Lech Poznań in 2018. Later that year, he signed with Universitatea Craiova.

Koljić made his senior international debut for Bosnia and Herzegovina in 2018.

Club career

Early career
Koljić started playing football at a local club, before joining youth academy of Slovenian team Maribor in 2011. He made his professional debut playing for Triglav against Olimpija Ljubljana on 26 October 2013 at the age of 18.

In the summer of 2014, he moved to Krupa.

In February 2015, he switched to Borac Banja Luka. On 25 April, he scored his first professional goal against Radnik Bijeljina.

In January 2016, Koljić returned to Krupa. He scored his first career hat-trick in a triumph over Rudar Prijedor on 29 November 2017. In February 2018, he was loaned to Polish side Lech Poznań until the end of season.

Universitatea Craiova
In August, Koljić was transferred to Romanian outfit Universitatea Craiova for an undisclosed fee. He made his official debut for the team against Dinamo București on 1 September and managed to score a goal.

In July 2020, he extended his contract until June 2025.

He won his first trophy with the club on 22 May 2021, by beating Astra in Cupa României final.

International career
In January 2018, Koljić received his first senior call-up to Bosnia and Herzegovina, for friendly games against the United States and Mexico. He debuted against the former on 28 January.

Career statistics

Club

International

Honours
Krupa
First League of RS: 2015–16

Universitatea Craiova
Cupa României: 2020–21
Supercupa României: 2021

References

External links

1995 births
Living people
Footballers from Valladolid
Spanish people of Bosnia and Herzegovina descent
Bosniaks of Bosnia and Herzegovina
Citizens of Bosnia and Herzegovina through descent
Bosnia and Herzegovina footballers
Bosnia and Herzegovina international footballers
Bosnia and Herzegovina expatriate footballers
Association football forwards
NK Triglav Kranj players
FK Krupa players
FK Borac Banja Luka players
Lech Poznań players
CS Universitatea Craiova players
Slovenian PrvaLiga players
First League of the Republika Srpska players
Premier League of Bosnia and Herzegovina players
Ekstraklasa players
Liga I players
Expatriate footballers in Slovenia
Expatriate footballers in Poland
Expatriate footballers in Romania
Bosnia and Herzegovina expatriate sportspeople in Slovenia
Bosnia and Herzegovina expatriate sportspeople in Poland
Bosnia and Herzegovina expatriate sportspeople in Romania